Saint Magnus of Avignon (died 660) was a bishop and governor of Avignon, his native city. He was a Gallo-Roman senator. A widower, he was the father of Saint Agricola of Avignon.  Magnus became a monk and then became bishop of Avignon.  He appointed his son coadjutor. He is the patron saint of fish dealers and fishmongers.   His feast day is August 19.

External links
Patron Saints Index

660 deaths
Bishops of Avignon
7th-century Frankish saints
7th-century Gallo-Roman people
Married Roman Catholic bishops
Year of birth unknown